Xu Hongzhi (born 26 September 1996) is a Chinese short track speed skater. He competed in the 2018 Winter Olympics.

References

External links

1996 births
Living people
Chinese male short track speed skaters
Olympic short track speed skaters of China
Olympic silver medalists for China
Olympic medalists in short track speed skating
Short track speed skaters at the 2018 Winter Olympics
Medalists at the 2018 Winter Olympics
Asian Games medalists in short track speed skating
Asian Games gold medalists for China
Short track speed skaters at the 2017 Asian Winter Games
Medalists at the 2017 Asian Winter Games
World Short Track Speed Skating Championships medalists
People from Jiamusi
Short track speed skaters at the 2012 Winter Youth Olympics
21st-century Chinese people